Ndumu may be,

Ndumu language
Vincent Ndumu